Joan C. Williams (born 1952) is an American feminist legal scholar whose work focuses on issues faced by women in the workplace. She currently serves as the Founding Director at the Center for WorkLife Law. Williams is also a Distinguished Professor of Law at the University of California, Hastings School Law. Williams also contributes to the Harvard Business Review blog, the Huffington Post, and the Psychology Today blog.

Education
Williams received a B.A. in history from Yale University, a master's degree in City Planning from the Massachusetts Institute of Technology, and a J.D. from Harvard Law School.

Women in the workplace
The primary focus of Williams's work has been "gender inequality" in the workplace and the lack of women in leadership positions. She looks at how "gender roles" and expectations influence career success of both women and men. Her main arguments focus on the need (in her view) for both men and women's roles to be changed so that there will be more women in the workforce.

In Unbending Gender: Why Family and Work Conflict and What To Do About It, winner of the 2000 Gustavus Myers Outstanding Book Award, she argues that in order for there to be equal outcome for men and women in the workplace, not only must women be "freed" from their traditionally exclusive responsibility for child-rearing, housekeeping, and other domestic duties; but that men need to be "freed" from their traditionally exclusive role as breadwinner.

In her book What Works for Women at Work: Four Patterns Working Women Need to Know, co-authored with her daughter Rachel Dempsey, she claims there are four obstacles that women face:
 The pressure for women to constantly prove their competence at work.
 The need for women to find the right balance between masculinity and femininity in the workplace.
 The long-discussed issue of mothers balancing responsibilities at home and work.
 The idea that women's strategies for solving these issues vary and they often feel compelled to argue for their way and against the ways of other women.

Center for Work Life Law
The Center for Work Life Law was founded by Williams with the goal of creating new initiatives that would help women to succeed in the workplace, which she identified as having stalled, as women's involvement in the workplace hit a plateau in the 1990s. The Center aims to create concrete and permanent solutions to many of the problems faced by women.

Much of the work done attempts to marry research with policy in order to change attitudes towards working women, creating new methods for women to become leaders, and also integrates and stating that gender attitudes need to change for men, as well. To date, Williams and her colleagues have succeeded in formulating new best practices, legal theories, policies, and even a framework for performance evaluations that integrates research on gender issues in the workplace.

The Center for Work Life Law also has a series of initiatives and workshops aimed at providing women with skills and support in order to become leaders in their workplaces and also provides companies and organizations with information and training on how to create an environment that allows for women to advance. Additionally, their Gender Bias Learning Project works with universities to retain women in STEM programs.

Selected works

See also
 Feminist psychology

References

External links
 Work Life Law Center's List of Publications
 An Archive of Williams' Essays and Blog Posts
Faculty Page at UC Hastings

Feminist psychologists
Living people
Harvard Law School alumni
Yale College alumni
MIT School of Architecture and Planning alumni
Place of birth missing (living people)
1952 births
American legal scholars
American women legal scholars